The 1985 Associate Members' Cup Final, known as the Freight Rover Trophy for sponsorship reasons, was the 2nd final of the domestic football cup competition for teams from the Third and Fourth Divisions.

The final was played at Wembley Stadium in London on 1 June 1985, and was contested by Wigan Athletic and Brentford. Wigan Athletic won the match 3–1, with Mike Newell, Tony Kelly and David Lowe scoring the goals. The trophy was presented by guest of honour Elton John.

Match details

Road to Wembley

Wigan Athletic

Brentford

References

External links
Mudhuts Media report
Freight Rover Trophy – 1984/85

EFL Trophy Finals
Associate Members' Cup Final 1985
Associate Members' Cup Final 1985
Associate Members' Cup Final